Mohammadabad-e Salehan (also Romanized as Moḩammadābād-e Şāleḩān; also known as Deh-e Vaqmī and Moḩammadābād) is a village in Kabgian Rural District, Kabgian District, Dana County, Kohgiluyeh and Boyer-Ahmad Province, Iran. At the 2006 census, its population was 42, in 7 families.

References 

Populated places in Dana County